Angel Fire is a novel by bestselling author Lisa Unger writing as Lisa Miscione. It is the first book featuring Lydia Strong.

Reception
The book received mixed reviews. Publishers Weekly described it as "gripping and terrifying right through the carnage of its final scene" and commended the novel's depictions of grisly scenes. Rex Klett, writing for Library Journal, praised the Unger's writing style and the book's suspense. However, Kirkus Reviews called it "predictable" and "flatly written", criticizing Lydia's characterization.

References

2002 American novels
American crime novels
Novels set in New Mexico
Novels by Lisa Unger
Minotaur Books books